Ränneslövs GIF is a Swedish football club located in Ränneslöv, Halland.

Background
The club was founded as Ränneslövs Bollklubb in 1934, but it ceased to operate when the World War 2 broke out in 1939. However the last elected board felt responsible for the coming years and in early 1945 they started trying to get the club up and running again. They succeeded, and on 21 August 1945 they had an annual meeting when they decided that the new name for the club should be Ränneslövs GIF (in English: Ränneslövs Gymnastics and Sports Association).

Since their foundation Ränneslövs GIF has participated mainly in the lower divisions of the Swedish football league system.  The club currently plays in Division 4 Halland which is the sixth tier of Swedish football. They play their home matches at the Björkvallen in Ränneslöv.

Ränneslövs GIF are affiliated to the Hallands Fotbollförbund. The home colours of Ränneslöv is green and white hoops and white shorts. The away kit is yellow.

The keeper of Halmstad BK, Karl-Johan Johnsson played in Ränneslöv when he was younger.

Season to season

Attendances

In recent seasons Ränneslövs GIF have had the following average attendances:

Footnotes

External links
 Ränneslövs GIF – Official website
  Ränneslövs GIF Facebook

Football clubs in Halland County
Association football clubs established in 1945
1945 establishments in Sweden